Aleksandar Bajić (born 25 August 1987) is a Serbian professional footballer who plays as a striker.

Career
In his homeland, Bajić played for Radnički Beograd, Beograd (two spells), and Radnički Obrenovac in the Serbian League Belgrade, as well as for Teleoptik in the Serbian First League. He also spent several years abroad in Bosnia and Herzegovina, Slovenia, Russia, Hungary, and Slovakia.

References

External links
 
 
 

Association football forwards
Expatriate footballers in Bosnia and Herzegovina
Expatriate footballers in Hungary
Expatriate footballers in Russia
Expatriate footballers in Slovakia
Expatriate footballers in Slovenia
FC SKA Rostov-on-Don players
FK Beograd players
FK Radnički Beograd players
FK Radnički Obrenovac players
FK Teleoptik players
Footballers from Belgrade
HŠK Zrinjski Mostar players
FC ViOn Zlaté Moravce players
4. Liga (Slovakia) players
Nemzeti Bajnokság II players
NK Celje players
NK Primorje players
Premier League of Bosnia and Herzegovina players
Serbia and Montenegro expatriate footballers
Serbia and Montenegro expatriate sportspeople in Bosnia and Herzegovina
Serbia and Montenegro footballers
Serbian expatriate footballers
Serbian expatriate sportspeople in Hungary
Serbian expatriate sportspeople in Russia
Serbian expatriate sportspeople in Slovakia
Serbian expatriate sportspeople in Slovenia
Serbian First League players
Serbian footballers
Slovenian PrvaLiga players
Zalaegerszegi TE players
1987 births
Living people